Moon is a travel guidebook publisher founded in 1973 in Chico, California. The company started with travel guides to Asia and later also published guides to the Americas. The company is now based in Berkeley, California and published by Avalon Travel, a member of the Perseus Books Group.

External links
 Official Moon Travel Guidebooks website

Travel guide books